Elda is a city and municipality located in the province of Alicante, Spain. , it has a total population of 55,618 inhabitants, ranking as the 7th most populous city in the province. Elda joins together with the town of Petrer to form a conurbation with over 85,000 inhabitants. The river Vinalopó flows through the urban area of Elda.

Elda is known for its footwear industry, in particular for women's shoes. Tourist sites include the Footwear Museum, the Archaeological Museum, the Torre del Homenaje del castillo (a tower dating from the 12th century), Castelar Square, Count of Coloma Palace, the Town Hall and the church of Santa Ana. It also celebrates the important festival of Moros y Cristianos

Sport
CD Eldense is based in the city.

People
Elia Barceló, the writer, was born here in 1957
Ana Oncina the illustrator, was born here in 1989
Isabel Ortuño, handballer, was born here in 1982
Pedrito Rico, singer, actor and dancer
Alba Rico, Spanish singer and actress from Violetta, was born here in 1989.
Juan Pascual Azorín Soriano, former mayor

See also
Route of the Castles of Vinalopó
Sagrada Familia School

Notes

References

External links
 Ayuntamiento de Elda, Town Hall of Elda 
 Museo del Calzado, Footwear Museum of Elda 

Municipalities in the Province of Alicante
Vinalopó Mitjà